Joachim Hellgrewe (31 December 1887 – 30 March 1956) was a German painter. His work was part of the painting event in the art competition at the 1932 Summer Olympics.

References

1887 births
1956 deaths
20th-century German painters
20th-century German male artists
German male painters
Olympic competitors in art competitions
People from Berlin